Cricket Switzerland, formerly the Swiss Cricket Association (SCA) incorporated in the Canton of Zürich, is the first governing body of cricket in Switzerland.

History
The inaugural meeting was held on 9 March 1980 at the Australian Embassy in Berne, although, as the water colour of "Vue de la Ville de Genève et de Plein-Palais (Florence 1769-1845)" from 1817 by Giovanni Salucci shows, cricket has been played in Geneva since at least 1817.

Four clubs were represented at the original meeting: Bern C.C., CERN C.C., Geneva C.C. and Geneva Asians C.C., while apologies were received from Baden C.C., Basel C.C. and Zurich C.C. A draft constitution was agreed and subsequently ratified at the first annual General Meeting of the association. Today, the association has an associate membership of twenty one clubs & six affiliated clubs and associations.

The first S.C.A. President was David Barmes of Geneva C.C. and Roger Johnson (of the same club) the first Secretary. Brennan, the then Australian Ambassador, presented a trophy to be played for in a knock-out competition between six clubs divided geographically into two sections. The winners of each group then played in a deciding final, for which, in 1983, the Malaysian Ambassador donated a cup for the Man of the Match. The main S.C.A. competition has been reorganized several times since and the current league format involves fifteen clubs divided into East & West divisions.

In recent years, the Mr. Pickwick T20 Cup, a Twenty20 Competition, has been added to the fixture schedule.

In 1985, at the initiative of the Lyceum Alpinum, Zuoz, the SCA helped to organise the first Zuoz Cricket Festival. The Lyceum has a long tradition of cricket and other "British" sports (e.g. Eton Fives) dating from the 1920s when an English sports master was appointed. Following a modest start (only four clubs participated in 1985), the festival is now well established with the regular participation of eight clubs.

A Swiss national side played in the inaugural Cricketer International Tournament in Guernsey in 1990, narrowly missing the semi-final by 0.1 runs/over. Tours have been made over the years to various countries by individual clubs and by the Association, and there have been welcome visits by touring teams to Switzerland.

In 1985 the association was granted affiliate status of the ICC. In 2012, Switzerland lost its ICC affiliate status  due to the creation of a second organisation (Schweizerischer Cricket Verband).

On 1 March 2014 the association was rebranded as Cricket Switzerland. The current President of the Cricket Switzerland is Alexander Mackay. Elected in 2011, he became the Association's sixth President, succeeding John McKillop, attaining membership of Swiss Olympic at the Sports Parliament in November, 2017.

In October 2020, Cricket Switzerland re-applied for ICC membership.

Clubs playing in the Cricket Switzerland Premier League
This is the premier competition of cricket in Switzerland. It is played in a 40 over format and the top four teams from each division face off each other in quarterfinals.

Eastern Division
Aargau CC
Olten CC
Pakhtoon CC
Power Winterthur CC
Nomads CC
Novartis CC
Winterthur CC
St. Gallen CC
Zurich Crickets CC
Zurich Lions CC
Zug CC

Western Division
Geneva CC 
Geneva Sri Lanka CC 
Geneva XI Stars CC 
Geneva International CC
CERN CC
Bern CC
Rhone CC
Cossonay CC
Uprising CC

Clubs playing in the Cricket Switzerland Pickwick Cup T20 Competition

Eastern Division
Aargau CC
Olten CC
Pakhtoon Zalmi CC
Power Winterthur CC
Nomads CC
Novartis CC
Winterthur CC
St. Gallen CC
Zurich Lions CC
Zug CC
Zurich Crickets CC (I & II)

Western Division
Geneva CC
Geneva Sri Lanka CC
Geneva XI Stars CC
Geneva International CC
CERN CC
Bern CC
Cossonay CC

Women's Cricket in Switzerland
Women's Cricket began in earnest in Switzerland in the year 2016 with the formation of Zurich Sapphires Cricket Club.

Members of Zurich Sapphires later went on to represent the Swiss National Women's squad in 2017 at the Austria-Swiss 7 a-side series held in Vienna winning the competition and thus becoming the first women's cricket team in the history of women's cricket in Switzerland.

Player's representing the Swiss Women's Team in 2017
The following lists the Swiss squad that represented Switzerland in the Austria-Swiss series in 2017.
Jennifer Hallam (Captain)
Mrinalika Singh Dev
Sudha Shanmugam
Vijy Chittakkattu
Paulina Kratka
Varsha Patil
Veena Mampilly(+)

Youth Cricket in Switzerland
The following clubs cater for youth cricket in Switzerland
Basel Dragon Juniors CC
Cossonay Juniors 
Gingins
Geneva Regional Youth CC
La Chat
Lyceum Alpinum
Zurich Crickets CC
SSCA
Wettingen CC

References

External links
Cricket Switzerland
Fixtures and Results T20
Fixtures and Results 40-over

Cricket administration
Sports organizations established in 1980